Bertram Magnus Sandos (4 August 1901 – 23 August 1963) was a New Zealand rower who competed at the 1930 British Empire Games, where he won two medals, and at the 1932 Summer Olympics.

Early life and family
Born in Kaikōura on 4 August 1901, Sandos was the son of Johan Henrik Sandos and Clara Elizabeth Emily Sandos (née de Kierski). He was educated at Hamilton High School from 1916 to 1917. On 2 November 1927, Sandos married Jeannie Webster Milne, and the couple went on to have two children.

Rowing
A member of the Hamilton Rowing Club, Sandos was described in 1930 as a "strong, experienced oarsman". He represented New Zealand at the 1930 British Empire Games in Hamilton, Ontario, where he won a gold medal in the coxed fours, and a silver medal in the eights.

At the 1932 Summer Olympics, he was a member of the New Zealand crew that was eliminated in the repêchage of the men's eight.

Death
Sandos died on 23 August 1963, and he was cremated at Hamilton Park Crematorium.

References

External links
 
 

1901 births
1963 deaths
New Zealand male rowers
Olympic rowers of New Zealand
Rowers at the 1932 Summer Olympics
Rowers at the 1930 British Empire Games
Commonwealth Games gold medallists for New Zealand
Commonwealth Games silver medallists for New Zealand
People from Kaikōura
Commonwealth Games medallists in rowing
People educated at Hamilton High School
Sportspeople from Canterbury, New Zealand
Medallists at the 1930 British Empire Games